Ticha Peak is a 790 m peak on the east side of Omurtag Pass in Bowles Ridge, Livingston Island in the South Shetland Islands, Antarctica.  The peak is overlooking Perunika Glacier and Wörner Gap to the southwest, Huron Glacier to the southeast, and Kaliakra Glacier to the north.

The feature is named after Ticha River in Northeastern Bulgaria.

Location

Maps
 L.L. Ivanov et al. Antarctica: Livingston Island and Greenwich Island, South Shetland Islands. Scale 1:100000 topographic map. Sofia: Antarctic Place-names Commission of Bulgaria, 2005.
 L.L. Ivanov. Antarctica: Livingston Island and Greenwich, Robert, Snow and Smith Islands. Scale 1:120000 topographic map.  Troyan: Manfred Wörner Foundation, 2009.

References
 Ticha Peak. SCAR Composite Antarctic Gazetteer
 Bulgarian Antarctic Gazetteer. Antarctic Place-names Commission. (details in Bulgarian, basic data in English)

External links
 Ticha Peak. Copernix satellite image

Mountains of Livingston Island